Jbel Tamarrakoit is an extinct shield volcano located 60 km south of the city of Ifrane in the Middle Atlas of Morocco. This mountain is one of the three main volcanic structures of the Azrou region along with Jbel El Koudiate and Jbel Outgui.

See also 
 Azrou volcanic field

References 

Atlas Mountains
Geography of Fès-Meknès
Mountains of Morocco
Volcanoes of Morocco
Pleistocene shield volcanoes